Cupidesthes arescopa, the green ciliate blue, is a butterfly in the family Lycaenidae. It is found in Nigeria, Cameroon, Gabon, the Republic of the Congo, the Democratic Republic of the Congo, Uganda, Tanzania and Zambia. The habitat consists of forests.

The larvae feed on the leaves of Thea sinensis.

Subspecies
Cupidesthes arescopa arescopa (southern Nigeria, Cameroon, Gabon, Congo, possibly western Democratic Republic of the Congo)
Cupidesthes arescopa orientalis (Stempffer, 1962)  (Uganda, north-western Tanzania, north-western Zambia, Democratic Republic of the Congo: Uele, Sankuru and Lualaba)

References

Butterflies described in 1910
Lycaenesthini